Proto-Circassian (or Proto-Adyghe–Kabardian) is the reconstructed common ancestor of the Adyghean and Kabardian languages.

Phonology

Consonants
The consonant system is reconstructed with a four-way phonation contrast in stops and affricates, and a two-way contrast in fricatives.

Aspirated consonants to plain
In the Proto-Circassian there was a series of aspirated consonants that survived in the Shapsug and Bzhedugh dialect while they became plain consonants in the other dialects.

  →  
  →  
  →  
  →  
  →  
  →  
  →  
  →  
  →  
  →

Plain voiceless consonants to voiced 
In the Proto-Circassian there was a series of tense consonants that became voiced in the eastern dialects.

  →  
  →  
  →  
  →  
  →   /  
  →  
  →   /  
  →   /

Velar consonants to palato-alveolar
In the Proto-Circassian language there exist a palatalized voiced velar stop  , a palatalized aspirated voiceless velar stop , a palatalized voiceless velar stop   and a palatalized velar ejective  . The consonants гь , кь  and кӏь  survive in the Shapsug dialect, in the Besleney dialect and in the Kabardian Uzunyayla dialect. In other Circassian dialects they were merged with the palato-alveolar consonants дж , ч  and кӏ  respectively.

  →  
  →  
  →   /   /  
  →

Affricate to fricative
In the Abzakh and the Kabardian dialects, the affricate postalveolar consonants became fricative.

  →  
  →   /  
  →  
  →   /  
  →

Labialized voiceless velar fricative
Proto-Circassian had a labialized voiceless velar fricative [xʷ] which survived in the eastern dialects while it became a voiceless labiodental fricative [f] in the western dialects.

  →

Labialized postalveolar
Proto-Circassian had a series of labialized postalveolar consonants (t͡ɕʷ, ʑʷ, ɕʷ and ɕʷʼ). These consonants survived in the western dialects while they became labiodental consonants in the eastern dialects.

  →  
  →  
  →  
  →

Grammar

Numbers

Schleicher's fable
Schleicher's fable in Proto-Circassian:

χʷǝ č́ʷara-gjǝ

χʷǝ ja laśʷam mә q́ˤ:an

č́ʷara pǝʎ́an;

mǝ χwanǝta k:ʷǝm q:irǝ,

mǝ čʷǝχʷa čʷam,

mǝ ć̣ǝm pasa mǝš́ʷrǝ.

χʷǝ č́ʷara q̇́ˤan:

"źǝʁʷǝ sā ǵʷǝ,

q:ać̣am ć̣arǝ č́ʷara ḳ́ʷarǝ."

č́ʷara q̇́ˤan: "q:́ˤʷa χʷǝ!

źǝʁʷǝ š́a ǵʷǝ ć̣arǝ,

q:ać̣a, ł́a, č́ʷara laśʷam

ʎ́ʷa ḳ́ač̣ʷǝm čǝ-wǝ,

χʷiara-gjǝ laśʷam mә q́ˤ:a."

nǝ q:́aˤʷasa χʷǝ rǝq:ʷada q:ˤʷan.

See also

 Proto-Abazgi language
 Proto-Northwest Caucasian language

References

STAROSTIN, Sergei A.; NIKOLAYEV, Sergei L. (1994). A North Caucasian Etymological Dictionary: Preface.
Common West Caucasian: The Reconstruction of its Phonological System and Parts of its Lexicon and Morphology. Leiden, The Netherlands : Research School CNWS, 1996; xxvi, 452 p. : ill. ; 24 cm. 

Circassian
Northwest Caucasian languages